In materials science, asperity, defined as "unevenness of surface, roughness, ruggedness" (from the Latin asper—"rough"), has implications (for example) in physics and seismology. Smooth surfaces, even those polished to a mirror finish, are not truly smooth on a microscopic scale. They are rough, with sharp, rough or rugged projections, termed "asperities". Surface asperities exist across multiple scales, often in a self affine or fractal geometry. The fractal dimension of these structures has been correlated with the contact mechanics exhibited at an interface in terms of friction and  contact stiffness.

When two macroscopically smooth surfaces come into contact, initially they only touch at a few of these asperity points. These cover only a very small portion of the surface area. Friction and wear originate at these points, and thus understanding their behavior becomes important when studying materials in contact. When the surfaces are subjected to a compressive load, the asperities deform through elastic and plastic modes, increasing the contact area between the two surfaces until the contact area is sufficient to support the load.

The relationship between frictional interactions and asperity geometry is complex and poorly understood. It has been reported that an increased roughness may under certain circumstances result in weaker frictional interactions while smoother surfaces may in fact exhibit high levels of friction owing to high levels of true contact.

The Archard equation provides a simplified model of asperity deformation when materials in contact are subject to a force. Due to the ubiquitous presence of deformable asperities in self affine hierarchical structures, the true contact area at an interface exhibits a linear relationship with the applied normal load.

See also
 Surface roughness
 Burnishing (metal)

References

External links 
 

Materials science
Surfaces
Tribology